This is a list of libraries in Italy, arranged by region.

Northeast

Emilia-Romagna

 Biblioteca comunale dell'Archiginnasio, Bologna
 Biblioteca Salaborsa, Bologna
 Biblioteca Malatestiana, Cesena 
 Biblioteca Comunale Ariostea, Ferrara
 Biblioteca Estense, Ferrara
 Biblioteca Palatina, Parma

Friuli-Venezia Giulia

Trentino-Alto Adige/Südtirol

Veneto

 Accademia Galileiana, Padua
 Fondazione Querini Stampalia, Venice
 Fortuny Museum, Venice
 Biblioteca Marciana, Venice
 Petrarch's library, Venice
 San Lazzaro degli Armeni, Venice
 Museo di Storia Naturale di Venezia
 Zecca of Venice

Northwest

Aosta Valley

Liguria

Lombardy

 Biblioteca Queriniana, Brescia
 Biblioteca Ambrosiana, Milan
 Biblioteca di Brera, Milan
 Biblioteca europea di informazione e cultura, Milan
 Centro di Documentazione Ebraica Contemporanea, Milan
 Mansutti Foundation, Milan
 Museo Teatrale alla Scala, Milan
 Palazzo Sormani, Milan

Piedmont

 Royal Library of Turin
 Turin National University Library

Central

Tuscany
 
 
National Central Library (Florence)
Laurentian Library
Biblioteca Riccardiana
Biblioteca e Archivio del Risorgimento
Biblioteca Marucelliana 
Biblioteca Moreniana
British Institute of Florence
European University Institute Library
Gabinetto Vieusseux
Kunsthistorisches Institut in Florenz
Biblioteca delle Oblate
 Villa I Tatti
 Libraries in Grosseto
Biblioteca Chelliana
 Libraries in Livorno
Biblioteca Labronica F.D.Guerrazzi
 Libraries in Lucca
 
 
 Libraries in Pisa
 Biblioteca Scuola Normale
 Biblioteca Universitaria di Pisa
Biblioteca Cathariniana
 Libraries in Pistoia
Biblioteca Fabroniana
Biblioteca Forteguerriana
Biblioteca San Giorgio
 Libraries in Siena
Biblioteca Intronati

South

Abruzzo

Apulia

Basilicata

Calabria

Campania

 Biblioteca Nazionale Vittorio Emanuele III, Naples
 Girolamini, Naples
 Ospedale degli Incurabili, Naples
 State Archives of Naples

Islands

Sardinia

Sicily

See also 
 Books in Italy
  (est. 1930)
 List of universities in Italy
 List of archives in Italy
 Open access in Italy

Bibliography
in English
 
 

in Italian
 
  1955-
 Issues for 1992-2011 

Libraries
Italy
 
Libraries